The Lines family was a family in Birmingham, England, which included several notable artists, who are considered members of the Birmingham School. These included:

 Samuel Lines (1778–1863) and his sons
 Henry Harris Lines (1800 or 1801–1889)
 William Rostill Lines (1802–1846)
 Samuel Rostill Lines (1804–1833)
 Edward Ashcroft Lines (1807–1875)
 Frederick Thomas Lines (1808-1898)

A significant collection of their work is held by the Royal Birmingham Society of Artists; other works are in Birmingham Museum and Art Gallery.

References 

Culture in Birmingham, West Midlands
English families